Metamorphosis is an album by jazz arranger Wade Marcus, released in 1976 on ABC Records/Impulse! Records.  Wade Marcus was a prolific and influential producer during the 1970s, producing album by acts such as The Blackbyrds, Gary Bartz, A Taste Of Honey, The Sylvers, Eddie Kendricks, The Dramatics, Donald Byrd and Stevie Wonder.  The album hit #38 on Jazz Albums chart.

Track listing
"Metamorphosis" (Wade Marcus)
"Sugar Loaf Sunrise" (Esmond Edwards)
 "Would You Like To Ride" (Marlo Henderson)
 "Journey To Morocco" (Wade Marcus)
"Poinciana" (Buddy Bernier, Nat Simon)
"Feelings" (Morris Albert)
"Funk Machine" (Marlo Henderson)
"Daniel" (Elton John, Bernie Taupin)

Personnel
Joe Sample - Keyboards
Sonny Burke
Lee Ritenour
Henry Davis
Scott Edwards
Chuck Domanico
Harvey Mason
Bill Summers
Gary Coleman
Soloists
Lee Ritenour
Jerome Richardson - Saxophone, Clarinet, Flute
Red Holloway - Saxophone
Fred Jackson, Jr.
Warren Luening
Bill Green
Buddy Collette
Dorothy Ashby

References

Impulse! Records albums
1976 albums
Wade Marcus albums
Albums arranged by Wade Marcus